Ciara Mary-Alice Thompson (born 1996), known professionally as CMAT, is a singer, songwriter, and musician from Dublin, Ireland. Her debut album, If My Wife New I'd Be Dead, was released in February 2022 and entered the Irish Album Charts at number one. The Guardian wrote of her music; "Her songs are mournful yet accessible, emotionally literate and cleverly crafted, but, crucially, with a huge sense of humour..."

Career 
Thompson, who had aspirations to become a professional musician from a young age, relocated to Manchester, England to pursue a career in music with her then band, Bad Sea. After attending a songwriting workshop, Thompson was advised by English singer Charli XCX to reimagine her approach. Returning to Ireland, Thompson began self-releasing her music online to considerable attention and received radio play from RTÉ Radio 1 and BBC Radio 6 Music. Her debut album If My Wife New I'd Be Dead was released in February 2022. Metacritic, which aggregrates review scores, gives the album a score of 85 based on 8 reviews, indicating Universal acclaim. Hot Press magazine wrote that the album was "undoubtedly one of the most thrilling Irish pop debuts of the century." In a four star review, DIY (magazine) wrote; "‘If My Wife New…’ feels like a more well-rounded, modern proposition than one solely indebted to the oldest style going could suggest." The album entered the Irish Album Charts at number one. In June 2022, she released a single called "Peter Bogdanovich", which came with a video which featured CMAT dressing as the late director. On 19 August 2022, "Peter Bogdanovich" charted at number 20 on the Irish Homegrown Top 20. In March 2023, If My Wife New I'd Be Dead won the Choice Music Prize for Irish Album of the Year.

Discography 

Albums

 If My Wife New I'd Be Dead (2022)

Singles

 Another Day (KFC)  (2020)

 Rodney (2020)

 I Wanna Be A Cowboy, Baby!  (2020)

 Uncomfortable Christmas (2020)

 I Don't Really Care For You (2021)

 2 Wrecked 2 Care (2021)

 No More Virgos (2021)

 Lonely (2022)

 Every Bottle (Is My Boyfriend) (2022)

 Communion (Country Version) (2022)

 Mayday (2023)

Awards and nominations

Choice Music Prize

References

External links 
 CMAT on Bandcamp
 CMAT on Twitter

Irish musicians
Living people
1996 births
Musicians from Dublin (city)